Prince Heinrich LXIII Reuss of Köstritz (18 June 1786 – 27 September 1841) was a member of the House of Reuss.

Life 
After the death of his elder brother Heinrich LX (1784–1833) he was the senior member of the Köstritz branch of the House of Reuss. His sister Auguste Fredericka Espérance was the wife of Henry, Duke of Anhalt-Köthen.

He was married twice. On 21 February 1819 at Wernigerode Castle, he married on Countess Eleonore of Stolberg-Wernigerode (1801–1827), who was a daughter of Count Henry of Stolberg-Wernigerode. After she died, on 11 May 1828, Heinrich LXIII married her sister Countess Caroline of Stolberg-Wernigerode (1806–1899).

From 1833 until his death, he was a member of the First Chamber of the Saxon parliament.  As the owner of a Manor, he had been appointed by the king.  Among others, he owned estates in Klipphausen, Spreewiese and Klix.

Offspring 
Heinrich LXIII had the following children:

From his first marriage:
 Joanna, usually called Jenny (1820–1878), married in 1843 to Prince Ferdinand of Schoenaich-Carolath
 Heinrich IV, Prince Reuss of Köstritz (1821–1894), inherited in 1878 the title of Prince from his cousin Prince Heinrich LXIX Reuss of Köstritz
 Augusta (1822–1862), married the Grand Duke Frederick Francis II of Mecklenburg-Schwerin
 Heinrich VI Prince Reuss (1823–1823), died just days after his birth in Wernigerode
 Heinrich VII (1825–1906), Adjutant General of Emperor William I, the first German ambassador to Constantinople, lived most of his life in Trebschen (modern Trzebiechów, Poland)
 Heinrich X, Prince Reuss (1827–1847), his birth mother Eleonore died when he was born

From his second marriage:
 Heinrich XII, Prince Reuss (1829–1866), Lord of Stonsdorf; married in 1858 Anna Countess of Hochberg, Baroness to Fürstenstein; his grandson would marry Sophie Renate Reuss of Köstritz
 Heinrich XIII, Prince Reuss (1830–1897), Lord of Baschkow; married in 1869 Anna Countess of Hochberg, Baroness to Fürstenstein
 Louise (1832–1862)
 Heinrich XV, Prince Reuss (1834–1869), married in 1863 Countess Luitgarde of Stolberg-Wernigerode
 Anna (1837–1907), married in 1863 Prince Otto of Stolberg-Wernigerode
 Heinrich XVII, Prince Reuss (1839–1870), killed in the Battle of Mars-la-Tour

Ancestry

Footnotes

References 
 Gothaischer Hofkalender, various years of the 19th Century

Heinrich
1786 births
1841 deaths
People from Berlin